Poljane nad Škofjo Loko is a settlement in the Poljane Sora Valley in the Municipality of Gorenja Vas–Poljane in the Upper Carniola region of Slovenia.

St. Martin's Parish Church
The local parish church is dedicated to Saint Martin and was originally a Gothic building that was pulled down and rebuilt in the 1720s, probably by Matija Maček (c. 1657–1737) from the Poljane Valley. The second, Baroque, structure was blown up by the Partisans in 1944 and finally totally demolished in 1956. When this happened, remnants of the original church were found and some carved pieces of stone from the site are kept in the Škofja Loka museum. The current church was built in 1967 and the belfry was replaced in the 1990s.

Notable residents
Notable people that were born or lived in Poljane include:
Ivan Tavčar (1851–1923), writer and politician
Aleš Ušeničnik (1862–1952), neo-Thomist philosopher and theologian

References

External links

Poljane nad Škofjo Loko on Geopedia

Populated places in the Municipality of Gorenja vas-Poljane